Calliotropis cycloeides is a species of sea snail, a marine gastropod mollusc in the family Eucyclidae.

Description
The size of the shell varies between 4.5 mm and 7.5 mm.

Distribution
This species occurs in the Pacific Ocean off Fiji.

References

 Vilvens C. (2007) New records and new species of Calliotropis from Indo-Pacific. Novapex 8 (Hors Série 5): 1–72

External links
 

cycloeides
Gastropods described in 2007